The 1957 German Grand Prix was a Formula One motor race held on 4 August 1957 at Nürburgring. It was race 6 of 8 in the 1957 World Championship of Drivers. The 22 lap race was won by Juan Manuel Fangio, and is often cited as one of the greatest victories in racing history. It was Fangio's fourth victory out of the seven races in the season contested by Formula 1 cars - excluding the Indianapolis 500, in which only US drivers competed, using USAC Championship cars. Furthermore, due to the number of points he had accumulated in the season (34 to Luigi Musso's 16), his victory at the Nürburgring mathematically clinched Fangio's fifth World Championship title with two races to go. The race was also notable for being Fangio's 24th and last victory in F1; his career still stands as having the highest win percentage ever, with 46.15% of his 52 race entries being wins.

Report 

Fangio had taken notice of the tyre and fuel-level selection of the Ferrari drivers, and realized they were probably going to run the entire race without a pit stop. Fangio decided he would use softer tyres, and only a half tank of fuel. This would allow the car to take corners faster, but also require a pit stop. Fangio took his pit stop on lap 13, in first place, and 30 seconds ahead of Hawthorn and Collins.

The pit stop was a disaster; the mechanic removing the rear left wheel let the wheel nut roll under the car without noticing, and finding it took nearly half a minute. Fangio left the pit lane in third place, and 48 seconds behind Collins who was in second place. But in his Maserati 250F he began to mount a charge. Over the next 10 laps, Fangio broke and rebroke the lap record 9 times (7 of the records were in successive laps) and he took 15.5 seconds off Hawthorn's lead in the first lap, then another 8.5 seconds in the next lap. Early in the 21st lap, Fangio went on the inside of the left corner at the ESSO Terrasse taking second place from Collins. Late in the 21st lap, during a left corner, Fangio cut past Hawthorn on the inside of the corner, with only his right tyres on the track and his left tyres on the grass. This probably took place at the left-right combination before the Breidscheid bridge, as Fangio said it was at a 90° left followed by an also tight right just before Breidscheid and Hawthorn recollected being overtaken at a right turning bend. Fangio probably overtook Hawthorn in the left turn and then closed the door going to the right turn, thus boxing Hawthorn in. Fangio maintained his lead, but not easily, as Hawthorn fought back, nearly overtaking Fangio at a few corners, but to no avail, and Fangio won the race with about 3 seconds of a lead.

After the race, Fangio commented, "I have never driven that quickly before in my life and I don't think I will ever be able to do it again". Later on, Fangio was also quoted as saying:
"Nürburgring was my favourite track. I fell totally in love with it and I believe that on that day in 1957 I finally managed to master it. It was as if I had screwed all the secrets out of it and got to know it once and for all... For two days I couldn't sleep, still making those leaps in the dark on those curves where I had never before had the courage to push things so far."

To increase participation, the organizers opened the field to Formula 2 cars. The two races were run at the same time but the Formula 2 entries (shown in yellow) were not eligible for World Championship points and some sources do not consider these starts in career stats.

Classification

Qualifying

Race

Notes
 – Includes 1 point for fastest lap

Championship standings after the race 
Drivers' Championship standings

Note: Only the top five positions are included.

References

External links

German Grand Prix
German Grand Prix
German Grand Prix
German Grand Prix